Robert Goodenow (April 19, 1800 – May 15, 1874) was a U.S. Representative from Maine, brother of Rufus King Goodenow.

Born in Henniker, New Hampshire, Goodenow moved with his parents to Brownfield, Maine, in 1802.
He attended the common schools at that place and at Sanford in 1815 and 1816.
He studied medicine and law. He was admitted to the bar in 1822 and commenced practice in Wilton, Maine. He moved to Farmington, Maine, in 1832 and continued the practice of law. Goodenow was county attorney from 1828 to 1834.

Goodenow was elected as a Whig to the Thirty-second Congress (March 4, 1851 – March 3, 1853). He was an unsuccessful candidate for renomination.
He was appointed State Bank Commissioner in 1857. He was County Treasurer of Franklin County 1866–1868, then again County Attorney in 1869 and 1870, as well as Treasurer of Franklin County Savings Bank 1868–1874.

He died in Farmington, May 15, 1874 and was interred in Riverside Cemetery.

References

1800 births
1874 deaths
People from Henniker, New Hampshire
People from Farmington, Maine
County officials in Maine
Whig Party members of the United States House of Representatives from Maine
People from Wilton, Maine
19th-century American politicians
People from Brownfield, Maine